Brongkos is a Javanese spicy meat and beans stew, specialty of Yogyakarta and other cities in Central Java, Indonesia.

Brongkos stew should not be confused with the similarly named brengkes—the Javanese name for pepes which is food cooked in banana leaf package.

Ingredients
Brongkos consists of diced meat; either beef, goat meat or mutton, hard boiled egg and tofu, stewed with beans, usually black-eyed peas or red kidney beans and diced chayote and sometimes carrots. 

The coconut milk-based stews uses a rich mixture of spices, which includes black kluwek, bruised lemongrass, kaffir lime leaves, bay leaves, salt, palm sugar, spice paste consists of ground galangal, kencur, ginger, coriander, shallot and roasted  candlenut, also a whole of bird's eye chilies which add a surprising hot spiciness when bitten.

Brongkos often served together with steamed rice in a single plate as nasi brongkos (lit. "brongkos rice").

History and popularity

Brongkos, together with gudeg, sayur lodeh and rawon are considered as a classic Javanese dish. It is known as one of the royal dishes of the Kraton Yogyakarta, since it was said as the favourite dish of late Sultan Hamengkubuwono IX and his successor Sultan Hamengkubuwono X, thus subsequently offered in Bale Raos royal Javanese restaurant located within Yogyakarta palace compound and often served to the visiting royal guests.

Although brongkos is often associated with the city of Yogyakarta, this spicy meat and beans stew is quite widespread in Javanese tradition, especially in Central Java, as some cities has their own version and specialty, such as Demak, Solo, Magelang, and Temanggung.

Etymology 
The word “Brongkos” originally is from French, meaning “brownhorst,” which later became “Brongkos” in Java dialect meaning brown-meat food.

See also

 Gudeg
 Rawon
 Brenebon
 Semur
 List of stews

Notes

External links 

 Brongkos Recipes
 Brongkos video recipe in Youtube

Javanese cuisine
Indonesian stews